David John Haskins (born 24 April 1957, Northampton, Northamptonshire, England), better known as David J, is a British alternative rock musician, producer, and writer. He is the bassist for the gothic rock band Bauhaus and for Love and Rockets.

He has composed the scores for a number of plays and films, and also wrote and directed his own plays, Silver for Gold (The Odyssey of Edie Sedgwick), in 2008, which was restaged at REDCAT in Los Angeles in 2011, and The Chanteuse and The Devil's Muse in 2011. His artwork has been shown in galleries internationally, and he has been a resident DJ at venues such as the Knitting Factory.

David J has released a number of singles and solo albums, and in 1990 he released one of the first No. 1 hits on the then nascent Modern Rock Tracks charts, with "I'll Be Your Chauffeur". His most recent single, "The Day That David Bowie Died" entered the UK vinyl singles chart at number 4 in 2016. The track appears on his double album, Vagabond Songs.

Early life
David John Haskins was born on 24 April 1957 in Northampton, Northamptonshire, England. He is the elder brother of Kevin Haskins, also a musician and member of Bauhaus and Love and Rockets.

Music career

Bauhaus, early years

David J was a founding member of the highly influential English post-punk band Bauhaus in 1978, playing bass. David J wrote the lyrics of several Bauhaus songs (including their first single, "Bela Lugosi's Dead"). He sang backing vocals on many songs, and sang lead on "Who Killed Mr Moonlight?". Bauhaus first broke up in 1983, reforming periodically at later times.

His first venture outside of Bauhaus was a collaborative single, "Armour" / "Nothing", with artist and poet René Halkett, of the original Weimar Bauhaus school of art and design.

He began writing music for a solo career while still in the band, and continued after the band's break-up, releasing the dark Etiquette of Violence and Crocodile Tears and the Velvet Cosh, and played bass on two Jazz Butcher albums (A Scandal in Bohemia and Sex and Travel), both of which he also produced. J was also a part of the very short-lived band The Sinister Ducks, which included saxophonist Alex Green and comics writer Alan Moore. J also released an EP that was intended as a soundtrack to Moore's graphic novel V for Vendetta. In 1996, he once again collaborated with Moore alongside musician Tim Perkins when the trio recorded two spoken-word-with-music CDs, The Grand Egyptian Theatre of Marvels and The Birth Caul.

Love and Rockets

In 1985, J, his brother Kevin Haskins, and Daniel Ash, all former members of Bauhaus, formed Love and Rockets; J once again played bass guitar and also shared songwriting and vocal duties with guitarist Daniel Ash. His most notable lead vocal from this period was the minor hit "No New Tale to Tell". J maintained his solo career during breaks from Love and Rockets, releasing Songs from Another Season and Urban Urbane after his band's success with the single "So Alive". He also released one of the first No. 1 hits from the newly created Modern Rock Tracks charts, with "I'll Be Your Chauffeur". J participated in a Bauhaus reunion in 1998. Love and Rockets broke up in 1999, after seven albums. Following what was billed as a one-off performance of Bauhaus at the 2005 Coachella concert festival, Bauhaus reformed for a successful tour of the Americas in late 2005 and Europe in early 2006 as well as a final album, Go Away White.

2003–2010

J has also appeared on releases by Porno for Pyros and Jane's Addiction, and co-wrote the latter's 2003 album title track, "Strays". In 2005, J joined with cellist Joyce Rooks and electronica musician Don Tyler to make up the instrumental ensemble Three, who released their first album Evocations later that year. He played bass guitar for several tracks on the electro musician Mount Sims' 2005 release Wild Light.

In 2003, J started work on the song cycle score for an independent film about Elizabeth Short directed by Ramzi Abed, entitled The Devil's Muse. The soundtrack included guest artists and singers such as Ego Plum, Johnny Dowd, Jill Tracy, Abby Travis and Nora Keyes. He has also regularly shown his art in galleries across the globe, as well as being a resident DJ at various Hollywood hot-spots including The Standard Hotel, Kung Pao Kitty, and Knitting Factory.

In 2004, his first play Anarchy in the Gold Street Wimpy was staged in Atlanta by the Dad's Garage' Theatre Company. In 2005, he composed the original music for a stage production of Samuel Beckett's Cascando. In 2008, J wrote and directed a play, Silver for Gold (The Odyssey of Edie Sedgwick), which was restaged at REDCAT in Los Angeles in 2011. In 2008 J also released Go Away White with his Bauhaus bandmates and reformed Love and Rockets, who played at Coachella Music & Arts Festival as well as Lollapalooza that same year.

2008 also saw David J contributing lyrics and vocals on a track entitled "Sleaze" for the Dutch band Strange Attractor. This appeared on their album Mettle (2011). He worked with the band again when he supplied lyrics and vocals on "The Corridor" for the album Anatomy of a Tear (2011). In a similar vein, J wrote the lyrics and sang the lead vocal on the track "Spalding Grey Can't Swim", which appeared on George Sarah's 2012 release Who Sleeps The Sleep of Peace.

Recent years
In 2011, J released a new solo album that was dark cabaret-oriented, Not Long for This World, and provided bass for Voltaire's album Riding a Black Unicorn Down the Side of an Erupting Volcano While Drinking from a Chalice Filled with the Laughter of Small Children!. The following year he recorded bass for the song "Melody Dean" on the album Theatre Is Evil by Amanda Palmer & the Grand Theft Orchestra. He co-wrote the track "The Autumn Carnival" with Courtney Taylor-Taylor for the Dandy Warhols' album This Machine (2012). Also in 2012, he toured using his opening act Adrian H and the Wounds as a backing band.

David J produced and played bass, organ and sang on Starfishing (2012), the debut album by Darwin. He also co-produced, played bass and appeared on Darwin's follow up EP Souvenir (2014). featured David, Victor DeLorenzo (Violent Femmes) and Emily Jane White.

In 2013, he collaborated with producer Dub Gabriel, playing bass, bells and Farfisa organ alongside U Roy and Juakali. He also played bass on the Dub Gabriel-produced Jajouka Sound System track "Salahadeen", which featured Bashir Attar, leader of The Master Musicians of Jajouka on gaita.

At Halloween 2013, J, in collaboration with Jill Tracy, released "Bela Lugosi's Dead (Undead is Forever)". This was a dramatic cinematic reworking of the original Bauhaus song.

In 2014 David produced and played bass on a cover by Stellarum of the Blondie hit "Heart of Glass", which was met with very positive response from the song's composers Debbie Harry and Chris Stein. He played bass on the band's debut album, which he also produced.

His memoir Who Killed Mister Moonlight? (Bauhaus, Black Magick and Benediction) was published by Jawbone Press in the winter of 2014, to critical acclaim.

In 2015, J performed with Ego Plum on the theme of the Nickelodeon TV show Harvey Beaks.

In 2016, J recorded with the Theatre Bizarre Orchestra for a record entitled Carpe Noctem under the name M.C. Nightshade.

In 2018 J teamed up again with Peter Murphy on a world tour, celebrating 40 years of Bauhaus and in particular the album In the Flat Field.

In 2020 J released the track “( I walk away ) from the girl in yellow” for the Mexican - American label No Devotion Records compilation named “We are not safe yet “., Also participated in the label’s Mario Alberto Cabada ( Bolaspace ) own band named NUKES on the track “Death Sky” with Chris Connelly ( Ministry ) on vocals for which a video was produced.

On February 25, 2022, David announced his latest album on Mexicali based label No Devotion Records in collaboration with Los Angeles/Minneapolis-based label Give/Take, What The Patrons Heard. A collection of originals and covers recorded over the timespan of 34 years, originally only available digitally to David J’s Patreon subscribers.

Writing credits

Theatre
2004: Anarchy in the Gold Street Wimpy – writer
2009: Silver for Gold: The Odyssey of Edie Sedgwick – writer, director
2011: The Chanteuse and The Devil's Muse – writer, director

Books
2014: Who Killed Mister Moonlight? (Bauhaus, Black Magick and Benediction) (Jawbone Press)

Discography

Bauhaus

Love and Rockets

The Bubblemen

Solo

Studio albums

EPs

Singles

Film and theatre scores
2003: Cascando by Samuel Beckett (no label)
2007: The Devil's Muse (Ebola Music)
2009: Silver for Gold: The Odyssey of Edie Sedgwick by David J (Urban Urbane Music)
2012: The Chanteuse and The Devil's Muse (Urban Urbane)

Contributing musician

As a musician

1984: A Scandal in Bohemia by Jazz Butcher –  bass, glockenspiel
1985: Sex and Travel by Jazz Butcher – bass
1996: "Porpoise Head" by Porno for Pyros – bass
2003: "Strays" by Jane's Addiction – bass
2003: "She's in Fiesta's" by Panoptica – bass
2005: Evocations by Three (David J, Joyce Rooks, Don Tyler) – bass, arrangements
2005: Wild Light by Mount Sims – bass
2005: "Splinters of The Cross" by Basic – lead vocal
2005: "Angel David" from The Men Album by Jarboe – vocals / lyrics (with Robert Kaechele – programming)
2008: "Sleaze" by Strange Attractor – lead vocal
2008: Repo! The Genetic Opera (movie soundtrack) – bass
2010: "Stormwinds" by Armed Love Militia (Fairuza Balk & John Flannery) – bass, keys
2011: "The Corridor" by Strange Attractor – lead vocal
2011: "Salahadeen" by Jajouka Soundsystem (Bachir Attar & Dub Gabriel) – bass
2011: Riding a Black Unicorn by Voltaire – bass
2012: Starfishing by Darwin – production, bass, organ, vocals
2012: Theatre Is Evil by Amanda Palmer & the Grand Theft Orchestra – bass on track "Melody Dean"
2012: "Spalding Grey Can't Swim" by George Sarah – lead vocal
2013: "Luv n Liv" by U-Roy + Dub Gabriel – bass, glockenspiel
2013: "Take You Back" by Juakali + Dub Gabriel – bass, Farfisa organ
2013: "Take You Deep", "Blood Bound", "Voyage of The Damned" – shared vocals (with Johnette Napolitano) & acoustic guitar
2014: "Heart of Glass" by Stellarum – bass 
2014: "Stellarum" by Stellarum – bass
2014: Souvenir EP by Darwin – co-production, bass

As a songwriter
2003: Strays by Jane's Addiction – co-wrote track "Strays"
2005: Splinters of The Cross by Basic – co-wrote track "Splinters of The Cross"
2005: The Men Album by Jarboe – co-wrote track "Angel"
2008: Mettle by Strange Attractor – co-wrote track "Sleaze"
2011: "Anatomy of a Tear" by Strange Attractor – co-wrote track "The Corridor"
2012: "Who Sleeps The Sleep of Peace" by George Sarah – co-wrote track "Spalding Grey Can't Swim"
2013: "Take You Deep", "Blood Bound", "Voyage of The Damned" by Tres Vampires – co-wrote tracks
2014: "This Machine" by the Dandy Warhols – co-wrote track "The Autumn Carnival"

See also
Bauhaus
Love and Rockets

Further reading
Interviews, articles
 SuicideGirls interview with David J of Bauhaus (11 March 2008)
 Hybrid interview with David J about Bauhaus reunion
 David J's Black Dhalia: LA Weekly interview (24 March 2011)
 Los Angeles Stage Times preview of The Chanteuse and the Devil's Muse (August 2011)
 Interview about Chanteuse with David J (21 September 2011)
 David J to release new solo album (20 October 2011)
 Redcat website for Silver for Gold (December 2011)

Resources
 David J at Starry Records: Profile
 
 
  at Last.FM

References

External links

 
  on YouTube

1957 births
Living people
Gothic rock musicians
English rock bass guitarists
Male bass guitarists
Bauhaus (band) members
Love and Rockets (band) members
People from Northampton
Alternative rock bass guitarists
British post-punk musicians
Situation Two artists
Glass Records artists